Night trains of Norway (Norwegian: Nattog) are night sleeping car services provided by three different operators on four routes; Vy Tog on Oslo - Bergen (Bergen Line), Go-Ahead Norge on Oslo - Stavanger (Sørland Line), and SJ Norge on Oslo - Trondheim (Dovre Line) and Trondheim - Bodø (the Nordland Line).

All services are provided using WLAB-2 sleeping cars. El 18 locomotives with Class 7 cars are used on the Bergen and Sørland Lines, El 18 and Class 5 cars on the Dovre Line, while the service on the Nordland Line is provided using Di 4 engines with Class 5 cars. All night trains offer both sleeper cars with closed apartments with one or two beds in addition to regular sitting cars with individual seats in an open configuration.

History

Previously the Norwegian State Railways (NSB) offered night train services also from Oslo to Åndalsnes on the Rauma Line and to Trondheim on the Røros Line, but these services have been terminated. Services were also offered from Oslo to Stockholm in Sweden and Copenhagen in Denmark.

External links
 Night trains in Norway - Train configurations

Norwegian State Railways
Norway
Norwegian State Railways (1883–1996)